Mark Ralph (born 10 February 1980 in Paisley) is a  field hockey midfield player from Scotland. Ralph earned his first cap for the Men's National Team in 2011 against India, and went on to win 154 caps for Scotland and 24 caps for Great Britain. He scored 74 goals Scotland and 1 goal for GB. Ralph scored many of his goals due to a trademark drag flick. Ralph played his club hockey for Kelburne HC before moving to the Netherlands with powerful Dutch side Hockey Club Klein Zwitzerland, based in The Hague. On his return to Scotland he became the Player Coach of Kelburne HC for 5 seasons and helped the club achieve 11 National League titles in a row and compete with European clubs at the EHL, making the KO16 at his first attempt at coaching at this level.

Away from hockey, Ralph is a qualified Advanced Driving Instructor based in and around Glasgow. He also coaches at Glasgow Academy.

References
sportscotland

1980 births
Living people
Scottish male field hockey players
Field hockey players at the 2006 Commonwealth Games
Sportspeople from Paisley, Renfrewshire
Commonwealth Games competitors for Scotland